Before the Storm is the third studio album released by singer and songwriter Jack Savoretti. It was recorded at Kensaltown Studios in London and released on 4 June 2012.

Track listing
Not Worthy 
Take Me Home 
Breaking the Rules 
The Proposal 
Vagabond 
Changes 
Last Call 
Come Shine a Light 
Before the Storm 
Crazy Fool 
Lifetime 
Knock Knock 
For the Last Time

Reception

Critical reception of the album was generally positive.

Personnel
Jack Savoretti – Vocals, acoustic guitar
Pedro Vito – Electric guitar

Production
The Suppliers – Producers
Martin Terefe – Executive Producer
Dyre Gormsen – Mixing

References

2012 albums
Jack Savoretti albums
Albums recorded at Kensaltown Studios